A nose-leaf, or leaf nose, is an often large, lance-shaped nose, found in bats of the Phyllostomidae, Hipposideridae, and Rhinolophidae families. Because these bats echolocate nasally, this nose-leaf is thought to serve some role in modifying and directing the echolocation call.

The shape of the nose-leaf can be an important for identifying and classifying bats. Furthermore, the shape of the nose-leaf can identify behavior of the bat itself; by example, in the families that have the nose-leaf, experiments have shown it to act as a baffle and focus their emission beams.

References

Bats
Nose